Vladan Vićević (born 26 July 1967) is a Serbian-born Salvadoran football manager and former player.

Club career
Vićević made his Yugoslav Second League debut with Sloboda Užice in 1988. He made over 100 appearances in the second tier of Yugoslav football throughout the next four seasons.

After the breakup of SFR Yugoslavia, Vićević joined First League of FR Yugoslavia newcomers Bečej in 1992. He helped them to a fourth-place finish in the 1994–95 season, as the club earned a spot in European competitions for the first time in history.

In 1996, Vićević moved abroad to El Salvador to play for Águila under compatriot Milovan Đorić. He returned to Sloboda Užice in 1998, before retiring.

International career
Nicknamed El Bicho, Vićević became a Salvadoran citizen in February 1997 and was soon eligible to play for El Salvador. He made his international debut for his adopted country during the tenure of Milovan Đorić in a March 1997 friendly with Guatemala. His final cap came in a 1998 CONCACAF Gold Cup match against Jamaica.

In total, Vićević was capped 23 times by El Salvador between 1997 and 1998.

Managerial career
In July 2005, Vićević was appointed as manager of Águila. He resigned from his position in December 2006. In April 2007, Vićević took charge of Chalatenango. He left the club by mutual consent in February 2008.

In April 2022, Vićević was officially appointed as manager of Sloboda Užice.

References

External links
 
 
 

1967 births
Living people
Sportspeople from Užice
Naturalized citizens of El Salvador
Yugoslav footballers
Serbia and Montenegro footballers
Serbian footballers
Salvadoran footballers
Association football defenders
El Salvador international footballers
1998 CONCACAF Gold Cup players
FK Sloboda Užice players
OFK Bečej 1918 players
C.D. Águila footballers
Yugoslav Second League players
First League of Serbia and Montenegro players
Second League of Serbia and Montenegro players
Serbia and Montenegro expatriate footballers
Expatriate footballers in El Salvador
Serbia and Montenegro expatriate sportspeople in El Salvador
Serbia and Montenegro football managers
Serbian football managers
Salvadoran football managers
C.D. Águila managers
FK Sloboda Užice managers